Joseph Henry (December 10, 1823 in Mirecourt – 1870) became one of the most important bowmakers of the golden era of French bowmaking, working and collaborating with his master and employer Dominique Peccatte and business partner Pierre Simon

Henry studied with Peccatte and established his own shop in 1851. His bows are quite rare and sought after.

His work can be compared to that of Dominique PECCATTE. Henry was clearly his most talented student.

Henry was engaged by Simon c.1848, to work together in partnership (in what were formerly D.Peccatte’s Parisian premises). Although this association is thought to have ended acrimoniously in 1851, these few years were extremely fruitful for this pairing. Their work – both independently and in collaboration – garnered considerable acclaim, on one occasion winning them an Honourable Mention at the Great Exhibition in London in 1851." – Peter Oxley, Oxford 

Peccatte passed on to Henry and Simon his teachings from Persoit (Persois) regarding the cambering of the bow (the shaping and imprinting of the curve of the bow). This collaboration gave rise to what is considered to be the best wood-bending school in France: Persoit-Peccatte-Henry-Simon. 150-200 years later, it is difficult to find a bow made by any of these great craftsmen that is not still in full working order.

Itzhak Perlman primarily plays a bow made by Joseph Henry, circa 1851–1870, and also plays the “Soil” Strad, made by Antonio Stradivari in 1714 during his Golden Period. 

Other prominent violinists using bows by Joseph Henry include soloist Leonidas Kavakos, Benjamin Bowman (MET Opera Concertmaster), and Steve Kecskemethy (Portland String Quartet 1st Violin)

References

Sources
 
 
 Dictionnaire Universel del Luthiers – Rene Vannes 1951,1972, 1985 (vol.3)
 Universal Dictionary of Violin & Bow Makers – William Henley  1970

Bow makers
Luthiers from Mirecourt
19th-century French people
1823 births
1870 deaths